The knockout phase of the 2010 CAF Champions League will begin on 1 October 2010 and conclude by 14 November 2010.  The knockout phase involves the four teams who finished in the top two in each of their groups in the group stage.
Each tie is played over two legs, with each team playing one leg at home. The team that has the higher aggregate score over the two legs progresses to the next round. In the event that aggregate scores finish level, the team that scored more goals away from home over the two legs progresses. If away goals are also equal, the tie is decided by a penalty shoot-out – with no extra time being held.

Qualified teams

Semifinals

Aggregate 2 – 2.  Espérance ST advanced on the away goals rule to the 2010 CAF Champions League Final.

TP Mazembe won 3 – 1 on aggregate and advanced to the 2010 CAF Champions League Final.

Final

TP Mazembe won 6 – 1 on aggregate.

References

Knock-out stage